U.S. National Ski Jumping Championships in the winter sport of ski jumping are decided annually in the United States since 1905, except for the years 1919, 1943-1945 and 2020.

Origins
Ski jumping national championships organized by the National Ski Association of America (NSA) were held annually from 1905 - 1962. Ski jumping, a winter sport competed on specially constructed ski hills, had been introduced by Norwegian immigrants to the U.S. in the 1880s, with ski clubs and annual tournaments beginning shortly afterwards. The National Ski Association, formed by five Midwestern clubs, established categories of participation, scoring rules, and scheduled sanctioned meets, including the National Championship Tournament.

NSA National Championship Tournament
The National Championships were a stand-alone annual competition held during a two day tournament (typically in February, not the end of the ski season).  The tournaments were hosted at a member club jumping hill scheduled in advance. Points were awarded by three judges based on distance covered and proper form, combined over two jumps. Champion is the jumper who gets the most points per class, with a separate award for greatest standing distance. As an open competition through 1950, the entrants and tournament champion need not be a U.S. citizen. The National Ski Tournament featured Professional/Expert and Amateur/Novice class divisions, and may also include exhibition, Senior/veteran (over 31 years), and Junior (under 18 years) participation. Starting in 1948, the Class A (Expert) National Champion was awarded the Torger Tokle Memorial Trophy. No championships were held in 1919 and 1943–45, and in the years 1938, 1946 and 1952 separate open and closed competition national championships were awarded. Class B national championships were held 1908–1957. The 1904 Ishpeming annual tournament won by Conrad Thompson is cited by some sources as the first national championship, but this event was prior to official NSA tournaments.

The National Ski Association was succeeded by the United States Ski Association (USSA) as the U.S. national governing body for skiing.

USSA National Ski Jumping Champions

Starting in 1981, ski jumping championships were competed on both Normal and Large Hills, with hill size measured in meters. In 1997 USSA was renamed the U.S. Ski and Snowboard Association (USSA). Women's national championship was added starting in 1997. Since 2010 the championships have been awarded by season (as does the FIS), which means that the championships held in October 2013 count as 2014 champions. 

In 2017 USSA announced it was rebranding itself as U.S. Ski & Snowboard.

U.S. Ski & Snowboard National Ski Jumping Champions

The 2020 National Championships were cancelled due to the global pandemic.

See also
U.S. Ski & Snowboard
United States Nordic Combined Championships
United States Alpine Ski Championships
National Ski Hall of Fame
Holmenkollen Ski Festival

References

External links
USA Nordic Sport (USANS)
Ski Jumping Hill Archive

National championships in the United States
Recurring sporting events established in 1905